Estelle Winwood (born Estelle Ruth Goodwin, 24 January 1883 – 20 June 1984) was an English actress who moved to the United States in mid-career and became celebrated for her wit and longevity.

Early life and early career
Born Estelle Ruth Goodwin in 1883 in Lee, Hundred of Blackheath, Kent, she decided at the age of five that she wanted to be an actress. With her mother's support, but her father's disapproval, she trained with the Lyric Stage Academy in London, before making her professional debut in Johannesburg at the age of 20. During the First World War, she joined the Liverpool Repertory Company before moving on to a career in London's West End.

Broadway and West End career
She moved to the U.S. in 1916 and made her Broadway début in New York City. Until the beginning of the 1930s, she divided her time between New York City and London. Throughout her career, her first love was the theater; and, as the years passed, she appeared less frequently in London and became a frequent performer on Broadway, appearing in such plays as A Successful Calamity (1917), A Little Journey (1918), Spring Cleaning (1923), The Distaff Side (1934), The Importance of Being Earnest (which she also directed, 1939), When We Are Married (1939), Ladies in Retirement (1940), The Pirate (1942), Ten Little Indians (1944), Lady Windermere's Fan (1947), and The Madwoman of Chaillot (1948).

Film and television
Like many stage actors of her era, Winwood expressed a distaste for films and resisted the offers she received during the 1920s. Finally, she relented and made her film début in Night Angel (1931), but her scenes were cut before the film's release. Her official film début came in The House of Trent (1933), and Quality Street (1937) was her first role of note. She made no cinematic films during the 1940s, but expressed a willingness to participate in the new medium of television, starring in a television production of Blithe Spirit in 1946. During the 1950s, she appeared more frequently in television than she did in film in such series as Robert Montgomery Presents, Alfred Hitchcock Presents, and The Donna Reed Show. She played the character Hortense in the episode "Where's There's a Will" (30 August 1960) on the ABC sitcom The Real McCoys starring Walter Brennan. Her few films from that period include The Glass Slipper (1955), The Swan (1956), and 23 Paces to Baker Street (1956).

Her other film credits include Darby O'Gill and the Little People (1959), The Misfits (1961), The Magic Sword (1962), The Notorious Landlady (1962), Dead Ringer (1964), Camelot (1967) and The Producers (1967). She later denigrated the last film, saying she could not imagine why she had done it except for the money.

Her other work for television included guest roles in Dennis the Menace, The Twilight Zone, Thriller, Dr. Kildare,  The Man from U.N.C.L.E., The Name of the Game, Bewitched, Batman, Love, American Style, Cannon, Police Story, The F.B.I., and the last episode of Perry Mason, titled "The Case of the Final Fade-Out", in which she plays an aging actress who ends up as a second defendant. Winwood also appeared in the Barnaby Jones episode "Murder in the Doll's House" (03/25/1973).

Winwood's final film appearance, at age 92 in Murder by Death (1976), was as an ancient nursemaid to Jessica Marbles (a spoof of Miss Marple, played by Elsa Lanchester). In this film, she joined other veteran actors spoofing some of the most popular detective characters in murder mysteries on film and television (including Nick and Nora Charles and Hercule Poirot). When she took on her final major television role in a 1979 episode of Quincy, she officially became, at age 96, the oldest actor working in the U.S., narrowly beating fellow British actress Ethel Griffies. She continued making appearances until she was 100 years old. When she died at age 101, she was the oldest member in the history of the Screen Actors Guild.

Personal life
Winwood married four times, including to successful theater director, film director and producer Guthrie McClintic, character actor Arthur Chesney, a New Zealand rancher and marine solicitor Francis Barlow Bradley in Manhattan in 1928, and American actor Robert Henderson in 1944 in NYC, a man many years her junior from whom Winwood lived apart in her later life, though he would visit her several times a year. Winwood did not have children.

Winwood was good friends with Tallulah Bankhead, who died in 1968. Bankhead, actresses Eva Le Gallienne and Blyth Daly, and Winwood were dubbed "The Four Riders of the Algonquin" in the early silent film days, because of their appearances together at the Algonquin Round Table.
Winwood appeared as a character in Answered Prayers, Truman Capote's final, unfinished, thinly veiled roman à clef. In the novel, which uses her real name, she attends a drunken dinner party with Bankhead, Dorothy Parker, Montgomery Clift, and the novel's narrator, P.B. Jones.

In a 1979 interview at age 95, Winwood remarked that she smoked three packs of cigarettes a day. On her 100th birthday, Winwood was asked how it felt to have lived so long, she replied "How rude of you to remind me!" Bette Davis, a co-star from Dead Ringer, was photographed at Winwood's side on the occasion in Hollywood, California.

Winwood died in her sleep in Woodland Hills, California, in 1984 at age 101. She was interred in the Westwood Village Memorial Park Cemetery.

Select filmography

References

External links

Eva Le Gallienne, Estelle Winwood
Estelle Winwood lithograph from magazine The Theater November, 1918

1883 births
1984 deaths
Actresses from Kent
Actresses from London
Algonquin Round Table
Burials at Westwood Village Memorial Park Cemetery
English centenarians
British expatriate actresses in the United States
English film actresses
English stage actresses
English television actresses
People from Lee, London
Women centenarians
20th-century English actresses